Entyloma dahliae is a species of smut fungus in the family Entylomataceae. It is the causative agent of Dahlia leaf smut. The species was described in 1912 by Hans Sydow and Paul Sydow.

References

Fungi of Europe
Fungal plant pathogens and diseases
Ustilaginomycotina
Fungi described in 1912
Taxa named by Hans Sydow
Taxa named by Paul Sydow